Zayatulak and Hyuhylu is a part-prose, part-poetry epic of the  Tatar and  Bashkir people who live in Russia. It is one of the first Bashkir and Tatar epics. 

The main characters are Zayatulak and Hyuhylu.

Summary 
At the start of the epic, Zayatulak dives in a lake, where a mermaid named Hyuhylu lives there. The epic is completed with the death of Hyuhylu while she was waiting Zayatulak, while Zayatulak was riding a tulpar. He was needing one more day to reach Hyuhylu. Shortly after Zayatulak commits suicide in the tomb of Hyuhylu.

Geographical places named in the epic 
The epic takes place in the following places in Davlekanovsky district, Bashkortostan:

Mount Balkan-Tau (Zayatulaktau)
Lake Kandrykul
Lake Aslikul

See also 

 Ural-batyr
 Akbuzat

References

Further reading 
  Accessed 4 Jan. 2023.

Bashkir mythology
Tatar culture